Ruthenium(III) fluoride is a fluoride of ruthenium, with the chemical formula of RuF3.

Preparation 
Ruthenium(III) fluoride can be obtained from the reduction of ruthenium(V) fluoride by iodine at 250 °C:
5 RuF5 + I2 -> 5 RuF3 + 2 IF5

Properties 

Ruthenium(III) fluoride is a dark brown solid that is insoluble in water. It has a space group of Rc (No. 167).

References 

Ruthenium compounds
Fluorides